MPB can refer to:

 Male pattern baldness
 Mountain pine beetle, a barkbeetle in the US and Canada

Health and science
 Morphotropic phase boundary, a zone e.g. in PZT ceramics

Companies and agencies
 Mississippi Public Broadcasting, US
 Maritime and Port Bureau, Taiwan

Arts and culture
 Monthly Playboy, Japanese edition
 Música popular brasileira, Brazilian popular music
 MPB4, a Brazilian musical group